2001 Academy Awards may refer to:

 73rd Academy Awards, the Academy Awards ceremony that took place in 2001 and honored the best in film for 2000
 74th Academy Awards, the 2002 ceremony honoring the best in film for 2001